David Viktorovich Yurchenko (born 27 March 1986) is a football goalkeeper. Born in Turkmenistan, Yurchenko represents the Armenia national football team.

Career

Club
On 17 June 2017, Yurchenko signed a two-year contract with FC Tosno.

He played as Tosno won the 2017–18 Russian Cup final against FC Avangard Kursk on 9 May 2018 in the Volgograd Arena.

On 18 June 2018, Yurchenko signed with FC Yenisey Krasnoyarsk.

On 22 January 2020, Yurchenko signed for Kazakhstan Premier League club Shakhter Karagandy.

On 14 January 2021, Yurchenko signed for Armenian Premier League club Alashkert.

On 1 February 2022, Pyunik announced the signing of Yurchenko. On 24 December 2022, Pyunik announced that Yurchenko had left the club.

International career
Yurchenko was born in Turkmenistan and raised in Russia, and is of Armenian descent through his mother - he was eligible for all three national teams. He debuted with the Armenia national football team in a 2-1 UEFA Nations League loss to North Macedonia on 5 September 2020.

Career statistics

Club

International

Statistics accurate as of match played on 27 September 2022

Honours

Club
Tosno
 Russian Cup: 2017–18

Alashkert
 Armenian Premier League: 2020–21

Pyunik
 Armenian Premier League: 2021–22

References

External links
 Profile at Krylia Sovetov Samara website
 
 

1986 births
Living people
Sportspeople from Ashgabat
Armenian footballers
Armenia international footballers
Turkmenistan footballers
Russian footballers
Armenian people of Ukrainian descent
Armenian people of Russian descent
Turkmenistan people of Ukrainian descent
Turkmenistan people of Armenian descent
Citizens of Armenia through descent
Turkmenistan people of Russian descent
Russian people of Armenian descent
Russian people of Ukrainian descent
Association football goalkeepers
Turkmenistan expatriate footballers
Russian expatriate footballers
Expatriate footballers in Latvia
Expatriate footballers in Belarus
Expatriate footballers in Kazakhstan
Russian expatriate sportspeople in Latvia
Russian Premier League players
FK Liepājas Metalurgs players
FC Dinamo Minsk players
PFC Krylia Sovetov Samara players
FC Volgar Astrakhan players
FC Mordovia Saransk players
FC Ufa players
FC Anzhi Makhachkala players
FC Tosno players
FC Yenisey Krasnoyarsk players
FC Shakhter Karagandy players
FC Alashkert players